Musixmatch is an Italian music data company and platform for users to search and share song lyrics with translations. It is the largest platform of this kind in the world having 80 million users (50M active users), 8M lyrics and 130+ employees.

In 2022, Musixmatch launched Musixmatch Podcasts a platform for transcription driven by AI and Community.

Overview 
Musixmatch's mobile app displays lyrics synchronized with the music being played. Its native apps can scan all the songs in a user's music library, find lyrics, and be used as a music player. On Android, it also supports music streaming services like Spotify, Google Play Music, Rhapsody, and YouTube. The company also has global agreements with Apple Music, Amazon Music, Instagram, Facebook, Google Search and Spotify.

Features 
Musixmatch has a free, public database where lyrics are displayed. To contribute to the database, users can sign up and contribute lyrics, synchronizations, translations, and structuring to get points and move up levels. Musixmatch's points have no redeemable value, but are instead a marker of a particular user's contributions.

Users that excel at contributing content to Musixmatch's database can take a test to become a Lyrics Curator, similar to the role of a Content Moderator. Lyrics Curators are eligible to assist Musixmatch with certain tasks in exchange for a monetary reward. Users who abuse Musixmatch for personal gain, including Lyrics Curators, are banned from contributing further. Musixmatch maintains quality guidelines as a standard to avoid such situations. Curators that repeatedly provide perfect/high-quality contributions have the chance to be hand-picked by Musixmatch to become a part of their internal team of Specialists, similar to an administrator, who approve and edit Curator contributions, and receive higher rewards.

Musicians also have access to Musixmatch Pro to verify, distribute to streaming platforms such as Spotify, and enhance their lyrics with synchronization, tags, and translations.

In October 2022, Musixmatch launched Podcasts, a platform that generates transcription every day for podcast episodes across different topics and charts, using its NLP base model architecture, Umberto, to tag keywords such as places, people and topics that are linked to topics on Wikipedia.

History 
Musixmatch was originally conceived in early 2007 by Massimo Ciociola, who later founded the company in 2010 in Bologna with Francesco Delfino, Giuseppe Costantino and Gianluca Delli Carri.

Musixmatch went live in July 2010, and by January 2015 had raised US$14.1 million in angel and venture capital funding. Musixmatch has signed agreements with publishers such as EMI Publishing, Warner/Chappell Music, Universal Music Publishing, Sony ATV, Kobalt, Peer Music and Disney Music.

The company provided Spotify's lyrics user interface on Spotify Desktop until this service was discontinued in May 2016, and again after November 2019 in certain regions. As of November 2021, this feature is available worldwide.

In June 2019, Musixmatch launched a partnership with Instagram, allowing all users to add Lyrics Stickers to any Instagram Music Story.

In September 2019, Marco Paglia, a Senior Product Director at Uber with past experience at Google, YouTube, Nokia, joined Musixmatch as Chief Product Officer.

In July 2022, Musixmatch announced a strategic significant investment from TPG. As part of the deal, David Trujillo and Jacqui Hawwa joined the Musixmatch's Board of Director. At that time, Gianluca delli Carri left the company to pursue his personal goals.

In February 2022 also Giuseppe Costantino has left the Company to purse his personal goals although remain an investor

References

Online music and lyrics databases
2010 software
Italian companies established in 2010
IOS software
Android (operating system) software
Companies based in Bologna
Italian music websites